Huntingburg Airport  is a public use airport located three nautical miles (6 km) south of the central business district of Huntingburg, a city in Dubois County, Indiana, United States. It is owned by the Dubois County Airport Authority. This airport is included in the National Plan of Integrated Airport Systems for 2011–2015, which categorized it as a general aviation facility.

Facilities and aircraft 
Huntingburg Airport covers an area of 480 acres (194 ha) at an elevation of 529 feet (161 m) above mean sea level. It has one runway designated 9/27 with an asphalt surface measuring 5,000 by 75 feet (1,524 x 23 m).

For the 12-month period ending December 31, 2010, the airport had 11,170 aircraft operations, an average of 30 per day: 95% general aviation, 4% air taxi, and 1% military. At that time there were 27 aircraft based at this airport: 48% single-engine, 30% multi-engine, and 22% jet.

References

External links 
 Aerial image from Indiana DOT
 Aerial image as of March 1998 from USGS The National Map
 

Airports in Indiana
Buildings and structures in Dubois County, Indiana
Transportation in Dubois County, Indiana